Yoo Young-a (born 15 April 1988) is a South Korean footballer who plays as a forward for Seoul City WFC in the WK League.

References

External links
 

1988 births
Living people
South Korean women's footballers
Women's association football forwards
South Korea women's under-17 international footballers
South Korea women's under-20 international footballers
South Korea women's international footballers
WK League players
2015 FIFA Women's World Cup players
Asian Games medalists in football
Footballers at the 2010 Asian Games
Footballers at the 2014 Asian Games
Women's association football midfielders
Asian Games bronze medalists for South Korea
Medalists at the 2010 Asian Games
Medalists at the 2014 Asian Games
Incheon Hyundai Steel Red Angels WFC players
Universiade gold medalists for South Korea
Universiade medalists in football
Medalists at the 2009 Summer Universiade